The Girlfriend Experience is an American anthology drama television series created, written, and directed by Lodge Kerrigan and Amy Seimetz that is broadcast on the premium cable network Starz. The first season stars Riley Keough as Christine Reade, a law student intern who also works as a high-end escort. Executive produced by Steven Soderbergh, it is based on the 2009 film of the same name. A 13-episode first season premiered on April 10, 2016, and all episodes were made available on Starz On Demand.

On August 1, 2016, Starz renewed the series for a 14-episode second season, focusing on new characters and storylines, with Seimetz and Kerrigan returning. The second season premiered on November 5, 2017.

In July 2019, Starz renewed the series for a 10-episode third season, which is written and directed by Anja Marquardt and stars Julia Goldani Telles. The third season premiered on May 2, 2021.

Plot

Season 1
Second-year Chicago-Burnham Law School student Christine Reade lands an internship at the law firm of Kirkland & Allen and struggles to balance her workload, expenses and classes. When her close friend Avery reveals that she has been working as an escort, she encourages Christine to tag along and introduces her to a friend of one of her clients, who is looking for an escort. Under the pseudonym "Chelsea Rayne", Christine works as a high-end escort specializing in providing "the girlfriend experience" (GFE), an array of sexual and other associated services intended to make the client feel both sexually and emotionally satisfied. Initially working for Avery's madam Jacqueline, Christine eventually strikes out on her own, experiencing pitfalls along the way as clients cross boundaries and she discovers corruption at Kirkland & Allen.

Season 2
The second season features two parallel storylines. One storyline, set in Washington, D.C., takes place during the upcoming U.S. midterm elections and follows Erica Myles, a finance director of a Republican super PAC, and Anna Garner, a GFE provider. Under intense pressure to deliver on her fundraising goals, Erica enlists Anna's help in blackmailing a high-powered dark money fundraiser. The other storyline, set in New Mexico, follows Bria Jones, a former high-end escort who enters the Witness Protection Program with her estranged thirteen-year-old step-daughter to escape an abusive relationship. However, she revives her career as an escort, which threatens Bria's new identity and well-being of her step-daughter and the U.S. Marshal put in charge of her.

Season 3
Iris, a neuroscience major, drops out of school and moves to London to join a tech start-up that is studying human behavior. As she begins to explore the transactional world of the girlfriend experience, she quickly learns that her client sessions provide her with a compelling edge in the tech world and vice versa.

Cast and characters

Main

Season 1: Christine
 Riley Keough as Christine Reade
 Paul Sparks as David Tellis
 Mary Lynn Rajskub as Erin Roberts

Season 2: Erica & Anna
 Anna Friel as Erica Myles
 Louisa Krause as Anna Garner
 Narges Rashidi as Darya Esford

Season 2: Bria
 Carmen Ejogo as Bria Jones/Sarah Day
 Tunde Adebimpe as Ian Olsen
 Harmony Korine as Paul
 Morgan Davies as Kayla Fairchild

Season 3: Iris
 Julia Goldani Telles as Iris Stanton

Recurring

Season 1
 Kate Lyn Sheil as Avery Suhr
 Alexandra Castillo as Jacqueline
 Amy Seimetz as Annabel Reade
 Aidan Devine as Martin Bayley
 Sugith Varughese as Tariq Barr 
 Michael Therriault as Skip Hadderly
 Sabryn Rock as Kayla Boden
 James Gilbert as Jack

Season 2
 Emily Piggford as Sandra Fuchs
 Michael Cram as Mark Novak

Season 3
 Charles Edwards as Elliott Stanton
 Jemima Rooper as Leanne
 Ray Fearon as Paul
 Enzo Cilenti as Sean
 Talisa Garcia as V Recruiter
 Armin Karima as Hiram
 Alexandra Daddario as Tawny
 Oliver Masucci as Georges Verhoeven
 Frank Dillane as Christophe
 Daniel Betts as Rupert
 Tobi Bamtefa as Brett
 Peter Guinness as Lief

Episodes

Season 1 (2016)

Season 2 (2017)

Season 3 (2021)

Production
In June 2014, the series was greenlit by Starz, with a 13-episode order with the series being based upon The Girlfriend Experience which was directed by Steven Soderbergh who also serves as an executive producer on the series, while Lodge Kerrigan and Amy Seimetz, wrote and directed all 13 episodes and also serve as executive producers. In September 2014, Riley Keough was cast as the female lead. Shane Carruth composed the musical score for the series. Principal photography took place in Toronto, Ontario, Canada.

In January 2017, it was announced that Louisa Krause, Anna Friel and Carmen Ejogo were cast as the three female leads of season 2. The second season features two parallel storylines, with Kerrigan and Seimetz each writing and directing their own storyline. In March, Narges Rashidi joined the cast of the series. Although there is no crossover between the storylines and Kerrigan and Seimetz worked independently, they did read each other's scripts. In an interview with Variety, Kerrigan said: "We respected each other’s work, and I think we have mutual respect as filmmakers, so we read each other’s scripts and watched each other’s episodes, but really, we just did our own thing."

In September 2017, Kerrigan and Seimetz indicated that they would not return for a third season. Kerrigan explained, "Amy and I are going to bounce after season two which was always the plan to allow new filmmakers to come in."

In July 2019, Starz renewed the series for a 10-episode third season, to be written and directed by Anja Marquardt. Filming for the third season began on August 20, 2020, in London, England.

Reception

Critical response
The first season of The Girlfriend Experience received positive reviews from critics, earning a rating of 85% with an average score of 8.5 out of 10, based on 40 reviews, on the review-aggregation website Rotten Tomatoes. The site's critical consensus reads: "The darkly fascinating (and utterly bingeworthy) The Girlfriend Experience powers past any shortcomings with a breakout performance by Riley Keough." Metacritic provides a score of 78 out of 100 from 27 critics, which indicates "generally favorable reviews". Matt Zoller Seitz, reviewing for Vulture, gave top praises to the series, stating that "The Girlfriend Experience is actually four or five shows rolled into one, and a big part of its specialness resides in those moments where it morphs from one thing into another", as well as giving high praise especially to the season finale: "[It] is the most daring, dense, allusive, and multilayered single episode of TV I’ve seen since the finale of season three of Louie".

The second season received positive reviews from critics. On Rotten Tomatoes, it has a 74% rating with an average score of 9.4 out of 10 based on 19 reviews. The site's critical consensus reads, "The Girlfriend Experience reinvents itself from a character study into an ensemble piece, thoughtfully unpacking thorny aspects of sexuality and providing rigorous programming for viewers who want to be both challenged and titillated". On Metacritic, it has a score of 72 out of 100 based on 6 reviews. Writing for Collider, Chris Cabin gave it a four star review and wrote that it's "one of the greatest seasons of television that 2017 has produced thus far." Writing for Variety, Sonia Saraiya felt that while the second season was "still directed and produced beautifully, with a soundscape so precise and intimate that it is haunting and immersive in a way little else on television can even approach", sex work and "even the sex worker herself" had become "secondary to the aims of the filmmaker", particularly in Erica & Anna, but that both storylines had fine qualities: "'Bria' is cinematically stunning, with a few sequences that are going to be hard to forget anytime soon. 'Erica & Anna' is a much more straightforward story, with a chilly aesthetic that makes 'House of Cards' look upbeat. But the relative opacity of 'Bria’s story' beats — and the oddly pat metaphors of 'Erica & Anna' — left me with the wish that these two well-matched directors might, you know, collaborate."

The third season has received somewhat positive reviews from critics.  On Metacritic, it has a score of 76 out of 100 based on 6 reviews.

Accolades
For the 74th Golden Globe Awards, Riley Keough was nominated for Best Actress in a Miniseries or Television Film.

Home media
Amazon Video acquired rights to the series for the United Kingdom, Germany, Austria and Japan, with the series premiering on June 27, 2016, excluding Japan. The first season was released on Blu-ray and DVD in region 1 on August 2, 2016.

References

External links

2010s American LGBT-related drama television series
2016 American television series debuts
2010s American anthology television series
2020s American anthology television series
English-language television shows
Erotic drama television series
Live action television shows based on films
Prostitution in American television
Serial drama television series
Starz original programming
Television shows filmed in Toronto
Television shows set in Chicago
Television shows set in London
Television shows set in New Mexico
Television shows set in Washington, D.C.